William Bartlit (1793 Conway, then in Hampshire Co., now in Franklin County, Massachusetts – February 19, 1871 Wellsville, Allegany County, New York) was an American politician from New York.

Life
In 1814, he removed to Cortland, New York. He was a harness and saddle maker.

He was a member of the New York State Senate (7th D.) from 1842 to 1845, sitting in the 65th, 66th, 67th and 68th New York State Legislatures.

He was buried at the Cemetery in Cortland.

Sources
The New York Civil List compiled by Franklin Benjamin Hough (pages 133ff and 138; Weed, Parsons and Co., 1858)
Obituary transcribed from the Cortland County Standard (issue of March 21, 1871), at RootsWeb

1793 births
1871 deaths
Democratic Party New York (state) state senators
People from Conway, Massachusetts
People from Cortland, New York
People from Wellsville, New York
19th-century American politicians